The Battle of Garoza was one of the largest battles of the Livonian Crusade which occurred in 1287 between the Livonian Order and Semigallians in the territory of modern Latvia. It was a severe defeat for the order which lost its master and several komturs.

Battle 
In March 1287, around 1,400 Semigallians attacked the crusader stronghold at Ikšķile and plundered nearby lands. Almost immediately after the attack, the master of the Livonian Order, decided to invade Semigallia in revenge.
The crusader army consisted of knights of the Order, units of citizens of Riga, and an unknown number of allied Livonians and Latgalians.
The crusader army lost its track and wandered for a few days through forests and marshes in Semigallia. However, the crusaders were followed by Semigallian scouts, so the location of their camp soon became known to the main Semigallian forces.

The next morning, the Semigallian army attacked the crusaders. At first, the battle went with varying success, but slowly the Semigallians gained the initiative and managed to besiege the crusaders' forces. Many of the knights were killed and many more, including a large number of allies, were taken prisoner. The Rhymed chronicle claims that only a few knights managed get back to Riga. Among the casualties were the master of the Livonian Order, Willekin von Endorp, and the Semigallian commander (sources do not mention his name).

See also 
 Garoza, a village in the Salgale Parish of the Ozolnieki Municipality.

Notes

Sources 
Livonian Rhymed Chronicle
Chronica der Prouintz Lyfflandt (Chronicle of Balthasar Rusow)

Garoza
Garoza
Garoza
Garoza
Semigallia